Yuri Konstantinovich Kuznetsov (2 August 1931 – 4 March 2016) was a Soviet football player and coach.

Honours
 Soviet Top League winner: 1955, 1957, 1959.

International career
Kuznetsov made his debut for USSR on 21 August 1955 in a friendly against West Germany. He scored goals in the next two national team games, but did not represent USSR after that.

Career statistics

International goals

References

External links
  Profile

1931 births
2016 deaths
Footballers from Baku
Azerbaijani footballers
Soviet footballers
Soviet Union international footballers
Azerbaijani football managers
Soviet football managers
Soviet expatriate football managers
Soviet expatriate sportspeople in Poland
Expatriate football managers in Poland
FC Dynamo Moscow players
Soviet Top League players
Neftçi PFK managers
Gwardia Warsaw managers
Association football forwards
Neftçi PFK players